This is the list of presidents of Trentino since 1948.

Politics of Trentino
 
Trentino